Gerry O'Sullivan (1 April 1936 – 5 August 1994) was an Irish Labour Party politician from Cork. He was a long-serving member of Cork City Council, and was Lord Mayor of Cork from 1986 to 1987.

O'Sullivan was first elected to Dáil Éireann at the 1989 general election as a Labour Party Teachta Dála (TD) for Cork North-Central having topped the poll. He was re-elected at the 1992 general election, receiving 10,008 first preference votes, again topping the poll.

In January 1993, after the formation of a Fianna Fáil–Labour coalition government, he was appointed as Minister of State at the Department of the Marine (with special responsibility for Port Development Safety at sea and Inland Fisheries).

He died in office in August 1994 following a short illness.

In 1996 the Port of Cork commissioned a new 30m, 176 ton tug and pilot vessel which was christened the M.T. Gerry O'Sullivan in his honour. The boat is usually moored in either Cobh or Ringaskiddy.

References

 

1936 births
1994 deaths
Labour Party (Ireland) TDs
Members of the 26th Dáil
Members of the 27th Dáil
Local councillors in Cork (city)
Lord Mayors of Cork
Politicians from County Cork
Ministers of State of the 27th Dáil